Robert Dahlgren (born 1 December 1979 in Skellefteå) is a Swedish auto racing driver who currently competes for the Scandinavian Touring Car Championship. He previously competed in Australia and New Zealand for a single season in the V8 Supercars Championship for Garry Rogers Motorsport, as well as in the World and for Polestar Racing, making him the longest-serving factory-supported Volvo driver.

Career

In 1998 he won the Nordic and Swedish Formula Ford Championships, before racing in Great Britain with Formula Ford. He won the Formula Ford Championship in 2001. He switched to British Formula 3 in 2002, finishing seventeenth in his first year. In his second year he finished ninth on points in 2003. Since 2004 he has competed in the STCC, every season with Volvo. He has finished as runner-up twice in 2004 and 2007.

For 2014, Dahlgren has been named to drive for Volvo in the International V8 Supercars Championship in Australia for Garry Rogers Motorsport, under the guise of Volvo Polestar Racing Australia. He finished 25th and last among full-season drivers, with no top 10s.

In 2016, Dahlgren joined Polestar Cyan Racing to compete at the 2016 Scandinavian Touring Car Championship with a Volvo S60, ranking second in points. He also entered three rounds of the 2016 World Touring Car Championship with the team, finishing seventh at Qatar race 1.

For the 2017 TCR Scandinavia Touring Car Championship, the driver moved to PWR Racing to drive a factory-supported SEAT León, winning the title. In 2019, Dahlgren took his second STCC title for PWR Racing.

Racing record

Complete World Touring Car Championship results
(key) (Races in bold indicate pole position) (Races in italics indicate fastest lap)

† Not permitted to score points.

Complete Scandinavian Touring Car Championship results
(key) (Races in bold indicate pole position) (Races in italics indicate fastest lap)

Complete TTA – Racing Elite League results
(key) (Races in bold indicate pole position) (Races in italics indicate fastest lap)

Complete V8 Supercar results

Complete Bathurst 1000 results

Complete World Touring Car Cup results
(key) (Races in bold indicate pole position) (Races in italics indicate fastest lap)

References

External links

 
 

1979 births
Living people
People from Skellefteå Municipality
Swedish racing drivers
Formula Ford drivers
British Formula Three Championship drivers
Swedish Touring Car Championship drivers
World Touring Car Championship drivers
World Touring Car Cup drivers
Supercars Championship drivers
Sportspeople from Västerbotten County
Garry Rogers Motorsport drivers
Fortec Motorsport drivers